The Makatea fruit dove (Ptilinopus chalcurus) is a species of bird in the family Columbidae. It is endemic to French Polynesia island of Makatea in the Tuamotu Archipelago.  Its natural habitat is subtropical or tropical moist lowland forests and is also present near villages. This bird is approximately 20 cm tall and has plumage of mostly green feathers with a dark purple crown and forehead, pale greenish-grey throat and chest, cloven lower chest feathers producing rows of shadows that appear as streaks, yellow underparts, tinged orange anteriorly. The bird's wing feathers are edged yellow. While it continues to be threatened by habitat loss, a decrease in mining since the mid 1960s has helped re-vegetation and appears to have stabilized population numbers.

References

Makatea fruit dove
Birds of the Tuamotus
Makatea fruit dove
Makatea fruit dove
Taxonomy articles created by Polbot
Endemic fauna of French Polynesia
Endemic birds of French Polynesia